Makroudh, also spelled Makrout, is a cookie from the cuisine of the Maghreb. It is filled with dates and nuts or almond paste, that has a diamond shape – the name derives from this characteristic shape.

The dough is made with a combination of semolina and flour, which gives the pastry a very specific texture and flavor. Makroudh can be fried in oil or oven-baked.

It is popular in the Maghreb where there are many varieties of Makroudh, some of which are pastries that do not share much in common with the traditional Makroudh except the shape. In Algeria, they may be filled with almond paste.

Makroudh with dates and honey is also popular during Eid al-Fitr.

Preparation 
Makroudh is prepared by filling a dough made with semolina, usually using the Deglet Nour date variety. The dough is then rolled and cut into diamond-shaped pieces. The pastry is then either fried or oven-baked. The final step involves soaking the makroudh in a sweet syrup.

See also
 List of Middle Eastern dishes
 List of African dishes
 Berber cuisine
Imqaret
Mamoul
Hamantash

References

Arabic words and phrases
Libyan cuisine
Tunisian cuisine
Algerian cuisine
Arab pastries
Moroccan cuisine
Cookies
Fig dishes
Date dishes
Stuffed desserts
Semolina dishes